The Rajiv Gandhi National Quality Award is the national quality award given by the Bureau of Indian Standards to Indian organisations that show excellence in their performance. It is named after Rajiv Gandhi, the former Prime Minister of India, and was introduced in 1991 after his death. The award aims to promote quality services to the consumers and to give special recognition to organisations that contribute significantly towards the quality movement of India.

The award is presented annually as per the financial year, and is similar to other national quality awards worldwide like the Malcolm Baldrige National Quality Award of the United States, European Quality Award of the European Union and the Deming Prize of Japan.

Awards
The award is presented to organisations in five broad categories: large scale manufacturing, small scale manufacturing, large scale service sector, small scale service sector and best overall. Furthermore, there are 14 commendation certificates for organisations showing excellence in various fields, including but not limited to biotechnology, chemicals, electronics, food and drugs, metallurgy, textiles, jewelry, education, finance, healthcare and information technology.

See also
List of national quality awards
Total Quality Management

References

External links

1991 establishments in India
Awards established in 1991
Indian awards
Quality awards
Memorials to Rajiv Gandhi